The End of Everything may refer to:
The End of Everything (album), an album by Moby under the pseudonym Voodoo Child
The End of Everything (EP), an extended play by Noah Cyrus
"The End of Everything" (Fear the Walking Dead), an episode of Fear the Walking Dead
End of Everything, a progressive metal band
"End of Everything", a song by Melanie C from the album Melanie C
The End of the End of Everything: Stories, a 2015 story collection by Dale Bailey
 The End of Everything (Astrophysically Speaking), a 2020 book by Katie Mack